Dade City North is a census-designated place (CDP) in eastern Pasco County, Florida, United States.  The population was 3,319 at the 2000 census.

Geography
Dade City North is located at  (28.378059, -82.197878).

Demographics

As of the census of 2000, there were 3,319 people, 910 households, and 663 families residing in the CDP. The racial makeup of the CDP was 55.05% White, 10.79% African American, 0.48% Native American, 0.12% Asian, 0.06% Pacific Islander, 29.77% from other races, and 3.74% from two or more races. Hispanic or Latino of any race were 56.49% of the population.

There were 910 households, out of which 43.5% had children under the age of 18 living with them, 45.9% were married couples living together, 17.1% had a female householder with no husband present, and 27.1% were non-families. 19.2% of all households were made up of individuals, and 8.8% had someone living alone who was 65 years of age or older.  The average household size was 3.39 and the average family size was 3.81.

In the CDP, the population was spread out, with 33.1% under the age of 18, 14.9% from 18 to 24, 29.3% from 25 to 44, 16.1% from 45 to 64, and 6.7% who were 65 years of age or older.  The median age was 26 years. For every 100 females, there were 121.3 males.  For every 100 females age 18 and over, there were 125.8 males.

The median income for a household in the CDP was $25,000, and the median income for a family was $25,987. Males had a median income of $18,817 versus $17,393 for females. The per capita income for the CDP was $10,129.  About 22.7% of families and 29.1% of the population were below the poverty line, including 36.3% of those under age 18 and 20.6% of those age 65 or over.

References

Census-designated places in Pasco County, Florida
Census-designated places in Florida